Athanasios Koutroumbas Insect Museum, also known as the Entomological Museum, is a museum in Volos, Magnesia, Greece.

It includes more than 100,000 specimens of more than 35,000 species, subspecies and breeds.

The greatest number are Lepidoptera.  One of its rare or unique specimens is one of the largest moths in the world, Thysania agrippina, of North America with a wingspan of 37-40 cm.  Note, however, that the largest known specimen of Thysania agrippina, as of March 2000 according to one source, was one of almost  wingspan, in Brazil.

It is claimed to be the only museum "of its kind in Greece and one of the best in the Balkans".

The museum may no longer exist or may have moved.

See also
List of museums in Greece

References

Insect museums
Insectariums
Magnesia (regional unit)
Natural history museums in Greece
Zoology museums in Greece
Museums in Thessaly